Parthenina emaciata is a species of sea snail, a marine gastropod mollusk in the family Pyramidellidae, the pyrams and their allies. The species is one of a number within the genus Chrysallida.

Distribution
This marine species occurs in the following locations:
 European waters (ERMS scope)
 Greek Exclusive Economic Zone
 Italy
 Mediterranean Sea
 Portuguese Exclusive Economic Zone
 South West Coast of Apulia
 Spanish Exclusive Economic Zone

Notes
Additional information regarding this species:
 Habitat: Known from rocky shores.

References

 Giannuzzi-Savelli R., Pusateri F., Micali, P., Nofroni, I., Bartolini S. (2014). Atlante delle conchiglie marine del Mediterraneo, vol. 5 (Heterobranchia). Edizioni Danaus, Palermo, pp. 1– 111 with 41 unnumbered plates (figs. 1–363), appendix pp. 1–91. page(s): 64, appendix p. 19; note: authority erroneously credited to (Brusina, 1886)

External links
 To Biodiversity Heritage Library (1 publication)
 To CLEMAM
 To Encyclopedia of Life
 To World Register of Marine Species

Pyramidellidae
Gastropods described in 1866